James Charles Bancks (10 May 1889 – 1 July 1952) was an Australian cartoonist best known for his comic strip Ginger Meggs.

Biography
James Charles Bancks was born in Enmore, New South Wales, Australia on 10 May 1889, the son of an Irish railway worker, John Spencer Bancks. Bancks left school at the age of 14 and found employment with a finance company. His first illustrations were accepted and published by The Comic Australian in 1913, followed by The Arrow in 1914. This encouraged Bancks to submit work to The Bulletin, where he was offered a permanent position, which he accepted and remained until 1922. Throughout this period he was studying art under Dattilo Rubbo and Julian Ashton and supplying freelance cartoons to the Sunday Sun.

He created Ginger (later Ginger Meggs) for the Sunday Sun and Sun News-Pictorial. Bancks created The Blimps for the Melbourne Sun in 1923, and this daily strip ran until 1925, the year when he launched Mr. Melbourne Day by Day for the Melbourne Sun-Pictorial.

Personal life

On 15 October 1931 Bancks married Jessie Nita Tait (daughter of theatrical entrepreneur, Edward Joseph 'E.J.' Tait) at Darling Point. She first worked as fashion adviser to her father's enterprise, since 1933 she published the column "Fashion Parade" in The Australian Women's Weekly. Jessie died in childbirth on 22 November 1936. In 1938 he married Patricia Quinan in Yuma, Arizona in the United States. They adopted a daughter, the artist Sheena Bancks, who married the actor Michael Latimer.

Bancks died on 1 July 1952 from a heart attack at his home in Point Piper, New South Wales.

On 26 July 1997 the Mayor of Hornsby, New South Wales formally named a park in Hornsby after Bancks's character Ginger Meggs. The area had an association with Bancks because he used to spend time there in his childhood. The park is located in Valley Road, adjacent to a creek that was named Jimmy Bancks Creek.

Selected writings
Ginger Meggs (1922–1952) – cartoon
Impressions of the Artists' Ball : In Line and in Rhythm (1922) – poetry
The Sunshine Family : A Book of Nonsense for Girls and Boys (1923) – children's fiction
Party Impressions (1929) – short story
The Man Who Knew Mailey (1930) – short story
Blue Mountains Melody (1934) – musical

References

External links
Bancks, James Charles. The Golden Years of Ginger Meggs, 1921–1952, edited by J. Horgan. Medindie, S.A.: Souvenir in association with Brolga, 1978.
Ryan, John. Panel by panel: a history of Australian comics. Stanmore, N.S.W: Cassell Australia, 1979. 
Strickler, Dave. Syndicated Comic Strips and Artists, 1924-1995: The Complete Index. Cambria, California: Comics Access, 1995. .

1889 births
1952 deaths
Australian cartoonists
Australian comic strip cartoonists
Australian comics artists
People from the Inner West (Sydney)
Australian people of Irish descent